Concertus Design and Property Consultants are formerly part of the property department of Suffolk County Council based in Endeavour House, Ipswich, England. They are an architectural and planning firm who although being independent, still do a lot of contracts for Suffolk County Council including schools. In 2014 they were listed in the top 50 for best architectural and construction firms in the sector in England. Concertus Design and Property Consultants biggest work is building/designing schools for the council as well as adding extensions to existing buildings like at Kesgrave High School. The firm provided advice as well as overseeing the project.

Notable buildings

The Brandon Center 
Kesgrave High School
St Christopher's - Red Lodge 
Clements Primary - Haverhill 
Westfield Primary - Haverhill 
Heath Primary - Kesgrave 
Whitehouse CP - Ipswich 
Felixstowe Academy
Ipswich Academy - 
Northfields Primary School 
Poplars Primary School 
Reydon and Southwold Community Fire Station

External links
 Official website

References

Ipswich
Suffolk County Council
Architecture firms of England
Companies based in Ipswich